is a supernaturalist multimedia franchise created by Level-5. The franchise is mainly known for its series of role-playing video games, which have been released for various different video game platforms. The franchise also includes several spin-off video games, anime and anime films, manga series, soundtracks, and strategy guides, among other media. The franchise's anime series are produced by OLM and the manga series are published by Shogakukan, who have serialized the series in various different magazines.

Yo-kai Watch was developed as a multimedia franchise, as Level-5 CEO Akihiro Hino believed it to be one of the main factors that made an IP long-lasting. Installments in the franchise are usually set in the fictitious region of Springdale and follows Nate Adams, a typical 5th grader who acquires the titular Yo-kai Watch, allowing him to see supernatural entities, named Yo-kai.

Video games

Main series

Spin-offs

Other

Television and films

TV series

Films

Soundtracks

Printed media

Manga

Strategy guides

Other

References 

Media
Mass media by franchise